HMS Thyme was a  which served in the Royal Navy during the Second World War. Laid down by Smiths Dock Company in April 1941, she was launched in July 1941, and commissioned in October 1941.

Background
Thyme was one of six Flower-class corvettes ordered on 3 August 1940. She was laid down at Smith Dock's South Bank, Middlesbrough shipyard on 30 April 1941, was launched on 25 July 1941 and completed on 23 October 1941.

Royal Navy service
Thyme began escorts on 21 November 1941, with the convoy HX 161, from Halifax, Nova Scotia to Liverpool. She spent most of her remaining career escorting convoys around the Indian Ocean and Africa.

Service after the Royal Navy
She was transferred to the Air Ministry for civilian service in 1947 and was designated the Weather ship, Weather Explorer. In 1958 she was sold again and became the Greek merchant ship Epos

References

Citations

Publications

External links
 HMS Thyme on the Arnold Hague database at convoyweb.org.uk.

 

1941 ships
Ships built on the River Tees
Flower-class corvettes of the Royal Navy
Merchant ships of Greece